Šeher Ćehaja Bridge (Bosnian, Croatian and Serbian: Šeher-Ćehajina ćuprija / Шехер-Ћехајина ћуприја) is a bridge which crosses the River Miljacka in Sarajevo, Bosnia and Herzegovina. It can be translated as "Mayor's Bridge" from Turkish word for mayor.

During the Ottoman rule, 13 bridges were built in Sarajevo.; one of the most impressive ones is Šeher Ćehaja Bridge. The only written document indicating the year of the erection of the bridge is transcript of the chronogram in Mostar indicating it was built in 994 AH (1585/1586 CE). According to the source, the bridge was constructed by a man named "Alija known as Hafizadić".

The Šeher Ćehaja Bridge was damaged couple  times during its existence. It happened during the huge floods of 1619 and 1629 as well as in 1843 when the Miljacka River destroyed two pillars during repairs by Mustafa-paša. The bridge was again damaged in 1880.

References

External links 

 Šeher Ćehaja Bridge - Sarajevo (dead link!)

Bridges in Sarajevo
Ottoman bridges in Bosnia and Herzegovina
Bridges completed in 1586
Rebuilt buildings and structures in Bosnia and Herzegovina
National Monuments of Bosnia and Herzegovina
Medieval Bosnia and Herzegovina architecture